Orban Cabinet may refer to:

 First Orban Cabinet, 2019–2020
 Second Orban Cabinet, 2020